Oh Hye-ri (Hangul: 오혜리; ; born 30 April 1988) is a South Korean taekwondo athlete.

Career
In 2011, she won silver at the World Championships, then in 2015, she became the world champion in middleweight.

She represented South Korea at the 2016 Summer Olympics in Rio de Janeiro, in the women's 67 kg where she won her first Olympic Gold Medal.

She became the third Korean to win an Olympic Gold Medal in the 67 kg division (Lee Sun-Hee in 2000 and Hwang Kyung-Seon in 2008 and 2012).

References

External links

1988 births
Living people
South Korean female taekwondo practitioners
Olympic taekwondo practitioners of South Korea
Taekwondo practitioners at the 2016 Summer Olympics
Universiade medalists in taekwondo
Universiade silver medalists for South Korea
World Taekwondo Championships medalists
Asian Taekwondo Championships medalists
Medalists at the 2009 Summer Universiade
21st-century South Korean women